Project Lingua, or just Lingua is an online translation community formed in the end of 2006 with the goal of translating articles from the global citizen media project Global Voices Online from English into other languages, opening lines of distributed communication between bloggers across the world. The project currently translates into tens of different languages, and incorporates an active team of hundreds of volunteer translators and translation editors. Along with the Cucumis project and the Wikipedia's own translation projects in every language, such as the Wikipedia:ECHO, Lingua is considered one of the largest volunteer-based online translation communities in the world.

Origin of the Project

Lingua began as a community-based initiative by Taiwanese blogger Portnoy Zheng, who started translating Global Voices articles into Chinese as early as September, 2005. This initial idea became a project of its own at the Global Voices Summit in December 2006, where it was given the name "Lingua".

The first official Lingua sites, launched by June 2007, were Chinese (both Simplified and Traditional), Bangla, Farsi, Spanish, Portuguese and French. The project has since grown rapidly in size and scope. Global Voices is translated in all the top languages used on the internet but also include under-represent and indigenous languages, such as Aymara. Translators apply via the Translation Application Form.

Global Voices now is available in Albanian, Amharic, Arabic, Aymara, Bangla, Bulgarian, Burmese, Catalan, Czech, Chinese (Simplified), Chinese (Traditional), Danish, Dutch, Esperanto, Farsi, French, Filipino, German, Greek, Hebrew, Hindi, Hungarian, Igbo, Indonesian, Italian, Japanese, Kazakh, Khmer, Kurdish, Korean, Malagasy, Macedonian, Nubian, Odia, Pashto, Polish, Portuguese, Punjabi, Romanian, Russian, Santali, Serbian, Spanish, Swahili, Swedish, Tetum, Turkish, Ukrainian, Urdu, Uzbek and Yorùbá.

Collaborations

Lingua has content-sharing/partnerships (formal and informal) with news sites and other online organizations, such as:

 Arabic: Al Jazeera Talk
 Bangla: Biborton Bangla (news/entertainment site, literary magazine)
 Chinese: China Times,  Memedia ("Strawberry") (news site), Peopo (Taiwanese citizen news site hosted by the Taiwan Broadcasting Service)
 Italian: Agoravox Italia, Rainews24, La Stampa
 French: Rue 89, Cucumis, Rezo.net
 Portuguese: Mozambican newspaper A Verdade
 Spanish: Canal Solidario, Periodismo Ciudadano, El Colombiano

Lingua has also partnered with like minded organisations to provide translations. In August 2012, Lingua launched a collaborative effort to translate the Declaration of Internet Freedom providing the text in 31 languages.

References

External links
Lingua site
OpenTranslationTools: Global Voices Lingua
GVsummit08 Budapest: Portnoy about Translation and the Multilingual Web

Translation
Translation associations
Citizen media
Multilingual news services
Organizations established in 2006